"Bittersweet" was the lead single from Boulder, Colorado-based rock band Big Head Todd and the Monsters' third album and major label debut Sister Sweetly, which eventually went platinum.  The song was their third biggest success charting at number 14 on the Mainstream Rock Chart.  It also "bubbled under" the Billboard Hot 100 at number 104.

"Bittersweet" had previously appeared on the band's independently-released live album Midnight Radio three years earlier in 1990.

References

1993 singles
1993 songs
Big Head Todd and the Monsters songs